Cycleryon is an extinct genus of decapod crustaceans. The type species is Cycleryon propinquus.

These epifaunal carnivores lived during the Jurassic of Germany and France, from 164.7 to 161.2 Ma.

Species
 Cycleryon elongatus Munster, 1839
 Cycleryon orbiculatus Munster, 1839
 Cycleryon propinquus Schlotheim, 1822
 Cycleryon wulfi Garassino and Schweigert, 2004

References

Polychelida
Jurassic crustaceans
Fossils of Germany
Fossils of France
Fossil taxa described in 1965